The Henry County Courthouse is located in Mount Pleasant, Iowa, United States, the county seat of Henry County. It was built in 1914, and was placed on the National Register of Historic Places in 1981.

History
The first buildings used by Henry County government when it was organized in 1837 was a series of log cabins in Mount Pleasant. This was a typical practice of most counties in Iowa. Plans for the first courthouse were accepted in June 1837, but construction of the  structure was delayed and the building was not completed until 1839. The second courthouse was a remodeled version of Hill Hall, which was built in 1870. The present courthouse replaced it on the same property in 1914. It was built by English Brothers from Champaign, Illinois.

Architecture
The courthouse is a simplified version of the Neoclassical style. The large, engaged columns features capitals in the Doric order. A small pediment surmounts the main entrance. The windows have short, simplified surrounds. The parapet does not culminate in a cornice of any kind.

See also

List of Iowa county courthouses
National Register of Historic Places listings in Henry County, Iowa

References

Government buildings completed in 1914
Buildings and structures in Mount Pleasant, Iowa
County courthouses in Iowa
Courthouses on the National Register of Historic Places in Iowa
Buildings and structures in Henry County, Iowa
National Register of Historic Places in Henry County, Iowa
Neoclassical architecture in Iowa